Rapid Reload, known in Japan as , is a run and gun video game developed by Media.Vision and published by Sony Computer Entertainment for the PlayStation in both Japan and Europe in 1995. The game was re-released on the PlayStation Network in Japan in 2007 and in Asia in 2010.

Gameplay
The gameplay of Rapid Reload is often compared to the Treasure game Gunstar Heroes. The players choose to play as either male character Axel or female character Ruka through the game's six levels.

The player can switch between four different weapons with a normal machine pistol, flamethrower, homing laser, and multi-directional cannons. The characters each have their own set of four weapons, totaling the weapons in the game to eight. Also available is a grappling hook that will latch onto any wall or ceiling. The player cannot be harmed while the player uses the hook. The player can also aim their weapons in any direction by holding R2 on the controller. The player can also throw their enemies in any direction, similar to how players Red and Blue can in Gunstar Heroes.

The unique feature in Rapid Reload/Gunners Heaven is the point system. Points are dropped after the player destroys enemies. When the player collects these items, the counter on the top screen rises and eventually will count down. As the player collects more points, their shots from the weapons will become more powerful than the ordinary shots. Occasionally, the player can find a booster item that temporarily increases the player's weapon strength to unbelievable heights, making the player annihilate any enemy easily. Unfortunately, the timer is unforgiving, and the player has a very short time using the booster item.

The game has six stages and during the stages, there is one or two sub-bosses and the one true boss.

Plot

Upon hearing the legend of the treasure known as the Valkiry, treasure hunters Axel Sonics (voiced by Kazuki Yao) and Ruka Hetfield (voiced by Noriko Hidaka) embark on an adventurous quest to find the legendary stone. However, unknown to Axel and Ruka at the start, there is also a terrorist organization known as the Pumpkin Heads searching for the Valkiry, determined to use the stone for world domination.

In a race to reach the stone first, Axel and Ruka fight their way through the Pumpkin Heads' army of elite soldiers along several locations, destroying each of the three top captains and eventually reaching their hideout, where they confront the Master, who already has the Valkiry in her possession. Using the Valkiry to power herself, the Master engages Axel and Ruka in a decisive, final battle, but is eventually destroyed and the Valkiry is freed.

The ending differs for each character: if Axel defeats the Master, he is joined by Ruka, who in her excitement takes the Valkiry and runs off, with the weary Axel only barely managing to keep up with her; if Ruka defeats the Master, she accidentally drops the Valkiry and it shatters, and in her frustration, she vows never to hunt for treasure again, although a caption mentions that she eventually stayed in the business with Axel.

Release
Rapid Reload was released in Europe and Japan but not in North America, reportedly due to Sony Computer Entertainment America's policy against releasing 2D games for the PlayStation.

Reception

On release, Famicom Tsūshin scored the PlayStation version of Gunners Heaven a 26 out of 40. The same version also received a 27 out of 40 from Famitsu PS. American magazine Next Generation reviewed the Japanese version of the game as an import, rating it four stars out of five, and stated that "Aside from hand cramps sure to come from mashing the fire button for three straight hours, it would be extremely difficult not to enjoy playing Gunner's Heaven."

Computer and Video Games gave the game an 89% score, considering it one of the best "platform blasters" while praising the "lush background, great spot FX and excellent game design" but said it is not as great as Gunstar Heroes. Maximum gave the PAL conversion a mixed review, describing it as a poor clone of Gunstar Heroes and elaborating that the "movement of the sprites, the enormity of the bosses, the ingenuity of the gameplay - in every respect the lowly 16-bit Sega title trounces this game. Rapid Reload doesn't even feature the simultaneous two-player mode of Gunstar ..." They also criticized the sloppy PAL conversion, and scored the game two out of five stars.

Notes

References

External links

Gunners Heaven at Hardcore Gaming 101

1995 video games
Media.Vision games
Multiplayer and single-player video games
Science fiction video games
PlayStation (console) games
PlayStation Network games
Run and gun games
Sony Interactive Entertainment games
Video games developed in Japan
Video games featuring female protagonists
Single-player video games
Video games about terrorism